Tamai Kobayashi (born 1966 in Japan) is a Canadian writer, who won the Dayne Ogilvie Prize for LGBT writers in 2014.

Kobayashi was co-editor with Mona Oikawa of All Names Spoken, an anthology of lesbian writing published by Sister Vision Press in 1992. She later published two short story collections, Exile and the Heart (1998) and Quixotic Erotic (2003), before publishing her debut novel, Prairie Ostrich, in 2014. In addition, she wrote the short film Short Hymn, Silent War, directed by Charles Officer, and her short story "Panopte's Eye" appeared in the 2004 science fiction anthology So Long Been Dreaming.

Her first short film, Later, In the Life, is about two older lesbians, whose friendship is affected when one of them starts dating.

She was also a founding member of Asian Lesbians of Toronto.

Works
All Names Spoken (1992)
Exile and the Heart (1998)
Quixotic Erotic (2003)
Prairie Ostrich (2014)

References

External links

1965 births
Living people
Canadian women screenwriters
21st-century Canadian novelists
Canadian women novelists
Japanese emigrants to Canada
Canadian women short story writers
Canadian LGBT rights activists
Canadian lesbian writers
Canadian LGBT novelists
Canadian writers of Asian descent
21st-century Canadian women writers
20th-century Canadian short story writers
21st-century Canadian short story writers
20th-century Canadian women writers
Canadian Film Centre alumni
21st-century Canadian screenwriters
Lesbian screenwriters
Lesbian novelists
21st-century Canadian LGBT people
20th-century Canadian LGBT people